Vyacheslav Evgenevich Yanovskiy ( sometimes spelt Viatcheslav Ianovski, born August 24, 1957, in Vitebsk, Belarusian SSR, Soviet Union) is a Belarusian boxer who won a Light Welterweight Gold Medal at the 1988 Summer Olympics for the USSR. He began boxing at the age of 13. In 1988 he became the Honoured Master of Sports of the USSR. During his amateur career he trained at Dynamo in Vitebsk.

1988 Olympic results 
Round of 64: Defeated Søren Søndergaard (Denmark) referee stopped contest in second round
Round o 32: Defeated Rashid Matumla (Tanzania) referee stopped contest in third round
Round of 16: Defeated Ludovic Proto (France) on points, 5-0
Quarterfinal: Defeated Anthony Mwamba (Zambia) on points, 5-0
Semifinal: Defeated Reiner Gies (West Germany) first-round knockout
Final: Defeated Grahame Cheney (Australia) on points, 5-0 (won gold medal)

Pro career
Yanovskiy turned professional in 1990 and did not lose in his first 26 fights. In 1995, he was KO'd by journeyman Edwin Murillo and got retired in 1997 with a career record of 30-1-1.

External links
 
  Profile in the Olympic Encyclopedia
 Biography

1957 births
Living people
Sportspeople from Vitebsk
Soviet male boxers
Honoured Masters of Sport of the USSR
Olympic boxers of the Soviet Union
Boxers at the 1988 Summer Olympics
Olympic gold medalists for the Soviet Union
Dynamo sports society athletes
Olympic medalists in boxing
Belarusian male boxers
Medalists at the 1988 Summer Olympics
Light-welterweight boxers